Amata tomasina is a moth of the family Erebidae. It was described by Arthur Gardiner Butler in 1876. It is found in Cameroon, the Democratic Republic of the Congo, Equatorial Guinea, Ethiopia, Ivory Coast, Rwanda, Sierra Leone, Sudan, Gambia and Uganda.

References

 Arctiidae genus list at Butterflies and Moths of the World of the Natural History Museum

tomasina
Moths described in 1876
Moths of Africa